Ricardo Elionai Rocha Escalante (born September 29, 1986) is a Mexican professional footballer.

References

External links
 

1986 births
Living people
Mexican footballers
Mexican expatriate footballers
Altamira F.C. players
Irapuato F.C. footballers
Ascenso MX players
Liga Premier de México players
Footballers from Mexico City
Association footballers not categorized by position